Cariño Brutal is the first EP by the rock band Slapshock, released in 2009.

Track listing 
All songs written by Jamir Garcia, Music By Slapshock

Personnel 
Jamir Garcia – vocals
Chi Evora – drums
Lee Nadela - bass
Leandro Ansing - guitar
Jerry Basco - guitar

Album Credits 
Produced By: Slapshock
Recorded and Engineered By Lean Ansing at Slaphouse Studios, Alley 2, Project 6, Quezon City, Philippines
Mixed By: J.D. Wong at Twenty One O Five Productions 46A, Lorong Rahim Kajai 14, Tmn Tun Dr. Ismail 60000 Kuala Lampur, Malaysia
Mastered By: John Greenhaim Area 51 Mastering, San Francisco, California
Photography By: EverywhereWeShoot.com
Packaging Design By: TeamManila.com
DVD Created By: Ayanstein Tolentino

References 

2009 debut EPs
Slapshock albums